The Battle of Castel di Sangro was a minor battle in the Neapolitan War that took place on 13 May 1815 in the town of Castel di Sangro in central Italy. The battle resulted in the Neapolitan force being routed.

Following defeat at the Battle of Tolentino, the 4th Division of the Neapolitan army, commanded by General Andrea Pignatelli di Cerchiara had detached from the main army under their king, Joachim Murat, and were retreating south. The commander of the Austrian force, Frederick Bianchi, dispatched his advanced guard, consisting of Hungarian hussars and Tyrolean jägers, in pursuit. 

The Austrians finally caught up with the Neapolitans on 13 May in the town of Castel di Sangro. Seeing the hussars, the Neapolitans formed squares. However, during the cause of the disastrous campaign, the 4th Division had been reduced to less than 2,000 men. The hussars broke the Neapolitan square and sent the remaining troops into disarray.

Citations

References

Further reading 
Capt. Batty, An Historical Sketch of the Campaign of 1815, London (1820)
Details of battle at Clash of Steel
 Castel di Sangro 13 maggio 1815. Una battaglia dimenticata (di Alessandro Teti, anno 2015).

External links

Conflicts in 1815
Battles of the Neapolitan War
Battles involving Austria
Battles involving the Kingdom of Naples
Battles in Abruzzo
1815 in Italy
1815 in the Austrian Empire
May 1815 events
Castel di Sangro